East Tanjung Jabung Regency is a regency of Jambi Province, Indonesia. It is located on the island of Sumatra. The regency has an area of 5,085.71 km2 and had a population of 205,272 at the 2010 census and 229,813 at the 2020 census. The capital lies at Muara Sabak.

Administrative districts
The regency is divided into eleven districts (kecamatan), tabulated below with their areas and their populations at the 2010 census and the 2020 census. The table also includes the locations of the district administrative centres, the number of administrative villages (rural desa and urban kelurahan) in each district, and its post code.

References

Regencies of Jambi